Cinema, Aspirins and Vultures is a 2005 Brazilian film directed by Marcelo Gomes. It was Brazil's submission to the 79th Academy Awards for the Academy Award for Best Foreign Language Film, but was not accepted as a nominee. It was also screened in the Un Certain Regard section at the 2005 Cannes Film Festival.

Plot synopsis
German national Johann is traveling in rural northern Brazil in the 1940s, selling the new drug aspirin by screening a short promotional film for isolated villagers, many of whom have never seen a motion picture. He meets drifter Ranulpho, who agrees to work for Johann in exchange for a ride to Rio de Janeiro. They have many encounters and misadventures on their journey, eventually selling out Johann's entire stock of aspirin to a wealthy brothel owner. 

When Brazil formally declares war on Germany in August, 1942, Johann is ordered to either return to his homeland or turn himself into a Brazilian concentration camp until the end of hostilities. Not wishing to participate in the European war, Johann paints over the advertising logos on the company truck, splits the sales money with Ranulpho, and smuggles himself onto a train with other workers who are supporting the Brazilian-American alliance by working on rubber plantations in the Amazonian jungle.

Cast

 João Miguel - Ranulpho
 Peter Ketnath - Johann
 Madalena Accioly - Mulher da Cobra
 Jeane Alves - Mulher Amamentando
 Daniela Câmara - Neide
 Veronica Cavalcanti - Maria da Paz
 Jorge Clésio - Funcionário dos Correios
 Lúcia do Acordeon - Sanfoneira
 Mano Fialho - Caçador
 Francisco Figueiredo - Rapaz na Estrada
 Paula Francinete - Lindalva
 Hermila Guedes - Jovelina
 Sandro Guerra - Homem da Cobra
 José Leite - Dono do Restaurante
 Nanego Lira - Funcionário da Estação de Trem
 Arilson Lopes - Dono do Posto de Gasolina
 Zezita Matos - Mulher da Galinha
 Osvaldo Mil - Claudionor Assis
 Fabiana Pirro - Adelina
 Rodrigo Riszla - Stand in
 Irandhir Santos - Manoel

See also
List of submissions to the 79th Academy Awards for Best Foreign Language Film

References

External links
 

2005 films
2000s adventure drama films
Brazilian adventure drama films
Films directed by Marcelo Gomes
2000s Portuguese-language films
Best Picture APCA Award winners
2005 drama films
2000s road movies